Cedar Island is an island and a small coastal unincorporated community in eastern North Carolina, United States. It is located in Carteret County. It was populated with local Native Americans prior to the arrival of European settlers. It is also the location of the state ferry transportation system dock, where travel can be made across Pamlico Sound to the island and village of Ocracoke in Hyde County.  The ZIP Code for Cedar Island is 28520.

History
Hurricane Dorian, in 2019, brought a 9 foot storm surge over the island and damaged one third of the buildings. 28 feral horses and approximately 15 feral (or abandoned) cows were swept away. Three cows were later found on North Core Banks, having swam a minimum of four miles, but possibly up to 40 miles after being in the water for 7-25 hours.

Roads
There are only two main roads on Cedar Island. Northbound Route 12 is the only way to drive to Cedar Island without using a ferry connection. This crosses Thorofare channel on the Monroe Gaskill Memorial Bridge.

Southbound North Carolina Highway 12 continues from the ferry terminal across Cedar island to meet with U.S. Route 70 on the mainland near the community of Sea Level, North Carolina. Motorists traveling north on N.C. 12 board the ferry to Ocracoke Island from Cedar Island.

Amenities
In 2005, the population of Cedar Island was about 350. Many residents are fishermen, though fishing is declining in the area. The other major employer is the North Carolina Ferry System. There are three churches on the island: Methodist, Free Will Baptist, and Primitive Baptist. The Methodist and Free Will Baptist maintain regular meetings and Sunday services. There are a few local businesses.

The main village of Cedar Island, formerly known as "Roe" is located along the north central portion of the island. There is a fisherman's harbor in this area.

Cedar Island has sandy beaches backed up against stands of juniper (mistaken by early settlers for cedars) and pine. More than half of Cedar Island belongs to the (Federal) Cedar Island Wildlife Refuge. The refuge is open for hiking and has a headquarters and information kiosk at the south end of the island, near the end of Lola Road.
There are boat ramps for public use.

Climate
The climate of Cedar Island is cooler than inland areas in the summer and warmer in the winter, and it is occasionally hit by hurricanes in the fall. Temperatures do not often fall below freezing in the winter, nor do they often rise above 90 degrees in the summer.

Neighboring communities
Swan Quarter - north across Pamlico Sound

References 

Unincorporated communities in North Carolina
Unincorporated communities in Carteret County, North Carolina
Islands of North Carolina
Islands of Carteret County, North Carolina
Coastal islands of North Carolina
Populated coastal places in North Carolina